The 2019 Texas Longhorns baseball team represented the Texas Longhorns baseball program for the University of Texas in the 2019 NCAA Division I baseball season.  David Pierce coached the team in his 3rd season at Texas.

Personnel

Roster

Coaches

Schedule

Notes

Rankings

References

Texas Longhorns baseball seasons
Texas Longhorns Baseball
Texas Longhorns